The Historical Archives of the European Union (HAEU), located in Florence (Italy), is the official archives for the historical documents of the Institutions of the European Union. It is also a research centre dedicated to the archival preservation and study of European integration and is part of the European University Institute (EUI).

Legal Basis and History 

The Historical Archives of the European Union was established in 1983 following the regulation by the Council of the European Communities and the decision by the Commission of the European Communities to open their historical archives to the public. A subsequent agreement in 1984 between the Commission of the European Communities and the EUI laid the groundwork for establishing the Archives in Florence, and the HAEU opened its doors to researchers and the public in 1986. In 2011 a Framework Partnership Agreement between the EUI and the European Commission reinforced the Historical Archives’ role in preserving and providing access to the archival holdings of the European Union's institutions and regulated the acquisition and treatment of private archives. In March 2015 the Council of the European Union amended the decisions of 1983 with the Council Regulation (EU) 2015/496.

Mission 

The HAEU preserves and makes accessible the archival holdings of EU Institutions and Agencies according to the 30 years rule governing access to archives of the European Union. It also collects and preserves private papers of individuals, movements and international organizations involved in the European integration process. It facilitates research on the history of the European Union and its predecessor institutions, promotes public interest in European integration and enhances transparency in the functioning of European Union Institutions.

Holdings 

The holdings are composed of fonds coming from the European Institutions, their predecessor institutions and European Union Agencies.

Among its holdings are the archives of the European Coal and Steel Community (ECSC), the European Economic Community (EEC), the European Atomic Energy Community (Euratom), the Common Assembly of the ECSC, the European Parliamentary Assembly, the Court of Justice of the European Union, the Economic and Social Committee, the Court of Auditors, and the European Investment Bank.

It also holds private deposits and collections from individuals, organisations and associations that advocated, supported and implemented the Post-World War II European conciliation and integration process. 
These holdings include the archival papers of the European Space Agency (ESA), the Assembly of Western European Union (WEU), the European Council for Municipalities and Regions (CCRN), the European League for Economic Cooperation (LECE) and a unique collection of federalist archives, for example the European Movement (ME), the Union of European Federalists (UEF) and the 'Centre international de formation européenne (CIFE)'.

In the framework of the activities of the ‘EU Inter-institutional Web Preservation Working Group’ and in collaboration with the Internet Memory Foundation the HAEU have launched in 2013 a archiving pilot project on EU institutions’ websites. These websites are captured quarterly since the end of 2013 and made available on the HAEU’s home page.

Premises 

Since 2012, the HAEU has his seat at the historic 'Villa Salviati' in Florence.

'Villa Salviati' is located on the Florentine hills along Via Bolognese and was named after one of its illustrious owners, Jacopo Salviati, who took possession of the estate in 1445. The Salviati family were wealthy wool merchants and bankers and during the 15th century closely connected to the Medici family.
 
A fortified house was present at the site since the 12th century, but the Salviati family elegantly decorated the villa and its gardens of 14 acres. The asymmetric facades show additions over the centuries, but retain some of the crenellated castle look that is typical for a palace outside the city walls. With the passing of the Salviati family, the estate to have changed hands many times in the last two hundred years and were owned by the Borghese princes, the English Vansittart, the tenor Mario Da Candia, and Gustavo Hagermann in the 19th century.

It is said that in this palace, Veronica Cybo, the wife of the Duke Salviati, consumed with jealousy, stabbed to death the Duke's mistress, a Caterina Canacci. Veronica arranged to lure the woman to the palace with the help of Bartolommeo, Caterina's stepson. She then proceeded to decapitate the unfortunate woman and then presented the head to her husband the Duke as a New Year's gift. For the crime, Veronica was exiled from Florence, and Bartolommeo, beheaded. Among the many allusions to the story, is a novel by Francesco Domenico Guerrazzi.

Since 2000 Villa Salviati is property of the Italian State and after the extensive restructuration it has been destinated to host the HAEU with 11,000 linear meters of shelving created in an subterraneous deposit.

On 17 of December 2009 the President of the Italian Republic Giorgio Napolitano has inaugurated the opening of the Historical Archives of the European Union at 'Villa Salviati' and in 2012 the Archives were operative.

Consultation Services and Research Assistance 

The HAEU is present on the World Wide Web since 1995 and has developed an electronic online database since 1991. All inventories of fonds, collections and oral history programmes held by the HAEU are published and searchable on its website. The HAEU also publishes the information and the classification schemes of the institutional holdings on the 'Archives Portal EUROPE' and it is linked to the social media Facebook, Twitter, YouTube and Flickr.

The digitisation programme of archival units and photographs of various fonds and deposits launched in 2006 lead to some 12.000 digitalized archival units being directly consultable on the web site in pdf-format. Likewise the 600 transcriptions of the European Oral History Program and many audio registrations can be accessed on the site.

The reading room at 'Villa Salviati' is open to the public for consultation of its holdings. The facilities include a specialized reference library composed of 20.000 publications, printed documentation, grey literature and electronic publications.

Access to all archival documents, collections and interviews preserved at the HAEU and available on line or in the reading room is free of charge.

The HAEU hosts and organises in close cooperation with the EUI History Department and with external partners research seminars, workshops and conferences. It proposes to be a meeting place between actors and researchers in European Integration matters. To this end, the HAEU co-directs with the EUI History Department the Alcide De Gasperi Research Centre for the History of European Integration, which was inaugurated on 6 May 2015 in the presence of Alcide De Gasperi’s daughter Maria Romana De Gasperi. The Alcide De Gasperi Research Centre aims at promoting innovative research projects and facilitates the use of primary sources. It also coordinates networks of scholars and promotes publications on the history of European integration.

References

External links 
Official Website 
eui.eu
archivesportaleurope.net

International organizations based in Europe
History of the European Union
Florence
European University Institute buildings
History of European integration